Jankovice may refer to:

Jankovice (Kroměříž District), a village in the Zlín Region, Czech Republic
Jankovice (Pardubice District), a village in the Pardubice Region, Czech Republic
Jankovice (Uherské Hradiště District), a village in the Zlín Region, Czech Republic